Yugoslavian postal codes were introduced on January 1, 1971 and consisted of five digits. The first two digits roughly corresponded to the routing zones, mostly matching each of the Yugoslav republics: 1, 2 and 3 for Serbia, 4 and 5 for Croatia, 6 for Slovenia, 7 for Bosnia and Herzegovina, 8 for Montenegro and 9 for Macedonia. District seat cities usually had 000 as the last three digits, while smaller towns and villages had non-round last three digits.

Former Yugoslav postal codes are still used in the successor states of Serbia and Montenegro. North Macedonia and Slovenia removed the first digit and the remaining four digits continue to be in use. In Bosnia and Herzegovina, postal codes were adapted to new administrative structures. Croatia and Kosovo have new postal code systems.

Address books
 Spisak poštanskih brojeva jedinica poštanske mreže SFR Jugoslavije, 1971. (in Serbo-Croatian)
 Popis poštanskih brojeva u SFRJ, PTT, 1971. (in Serbo-Croatian)
 Priručnik za primenu postanskog broja, SFRJ, 1971. (in Serbo-Croatian)

External links
Na poštnih pošilkach: poštne brojeve (On postal items: postal codes), an article in the Dolenjski list newspaper, Novo mesto, 7 January 1971, page 5 (in Slovene)
Imenik mesta u Jugoslaviji (Address book of places in Yugoslavia) from 1973 (in Serbo-Croatian)
Imenik naseljenih mesta u SFRJ (Address book of inhabited places in SFRY) from 1985 (in Serbo-Croatian)

See also
 Postage stamps and postal history of Yugoslavia

YU
YU